Ferid Ali (born 7 April 1992) is a Swedish footballer.

Personal life
Born in Sweden, Ali is of Somali descent.

References

External links 
 
 

1992 births
Living people
Swedish footballers
Swedish people of Somali descent
Vasalunds IF players
AFC Eskilstuna players
Association football midfielders
Allsvenskan players
Superettan players